Felice Rosser (born Detroit, Michigan) is a singer, songwriter, bass player, actor and writer. She now lives and works in New York. She is known for her powerful and emotional voice, her musical skill as a bass player and as a singer and songwriter. She also performs as an actress.

Education
She attended Cass Technical High School in Detroit before enrolling at Barnard College in New York City.

Career

Music
Rosser's musical career began playing bass in bands with singer/guitarist deerfrance and performance artist and writer jennifer jazz. She became interested in playing reggae music and joined Sistren, an all-female band led by drummer Annette Brissett. She has played with many musicians and artists including Bush Tetras, Jean-Michel Basquiat, Gary Lucas and Ari Up of the Slits. Rosser leads Faith, a group that includes guitarist Nao Hakamada. Faith has released a 7-inch "Like Springtime b/w Lost", and 2 CD's 2001's Time to Fall in Love Again and 2007's A Place Where Love Can Grow on Cool Baby Music. Faith also has a song "Time to Fall in Love Again" in the film “The Substitute part 2.”

Film and acting
Rosser has appeared in films including; Permanent Vacation directed by Jim Jarmusch, You are not I directed by Sara Driver and Born in Flames directed by Lizzie Borden. Rosser has also done theater work with The Puerto Rican National Traveling Theater and the off-Broadway production of “Driving on the Left Side.”

Writing
Rosser has published various short stories in Bomb Magazine.

Recordings

Discography
 Singles 
7 inch — "Like Springtime/Lost"

Albums
 Time to Fall in Love Again 2000 /Cool Baby Music,
 A Place Where Love Can Grow 2007 /Cool Baby Music

References

External links 

 https://www.faithnyc.net/

OLD faithny.com (archived Jan 6 2017)

Living people
American reggae musicians
Year of birth missing (living people)
Cass Technical High School alumni
Barnard College alumni